Cameroon women's national under-17 football team represents Cameroon in international youth football competitions.

FIFA U-17 Women's World Cup

The team has qualified in 2016

African U-17 Cup of Nations for Women

Current squad
Squad for the 2016 FIFA U-17 Women's World Cup.

See also
Cameroon women's national football team

References

External links 
Official Cameroonian Football Federation website

under-17
Women's national under-17 association football teams